Ishigami (written:  or ) is a Japanese surname. Notable people with the surname include:

, Japanese architect
, Japanese footballer
, Japanese footballer
, Japanese Roman Catholic bishop
, Japanese voice actress
, Japanese footballer

Fictional characters
, a character in the manga series Kaguya-sama: Love Is War
, a character from the manga and anime series Dr. Stone

See also
Ishigami Station, a railway station in Fujisawa, Kanagawa Prefecture, Japan

Japanese-language surnames